Narcissus is a c. 1500 painting of Narcissus by a follower of Giovanni Antonio Boltraffio, Leonardo da Vinci's collaborator in Milan. It is now in the National Gallery, London. It is a copy after Narcissus at the Fountain, an autograph work by Boltraffio now in the Uffizi. Unusually it shows the subject in modern dress and with a pile rather than the more usual pond or fountain, probably a pentimento

References

Italian paintings
Renaissance paintings
Collections of the National Gallery, London
1500 paintings